Five Across the Eyes is the second studio album by Danish death metal band Iniquity released in 1999 through Mighty Music.

Track listing
 "Inhale the Ghost" - 5:23 
 "Surgical Orb" - 4:12 
 "Sidereal Seas" - 5:36 
 "Random Bludgeon Battery" - 4:48
 "From Tarnished Soil" - 4:40
 "Reminiscence" - 1:07
 "Pyres of Atonement" - 4:00
 "The Rigormortified Grip" - 5:19 
 "Forensic Alliance" - 4:17
 "Cocooned" (Bonus track on limited digipak version) - 5:15

All songs arranged by Iniquity, except "Reminiscence"  by Carsten Nielsen.

Credits
Jesper Frost Jensen - drums 
Mads Haarløv - vocals, Guitar
Thomas Fagerlind - Bass 
Brian Eriksen - Guitar
Karina - Vocals on "Reminiscence"
Jacob Hansen - Producer, Engineer, Mixing

1999 albums
Iniquity (band) albums
Albums produced by Jacob Hansen